The 473d Infantry Regiment was an infantry regiment of the United States Army that served on the Italian Front during World War II. It was created on 14 January 1945 from existing anti-aircraft units that were no longer needed to defend against enemy aircraft. It was raised from the Headquarters Company, 2d Armored Group and the 434th, 435th, 532d and 900th Antiaircraft Artillery Automatic Weapons battalions.

Most of the elements of the 473d had been parts of Task Force 45. This was a division-sized unit built around the U.S. 45th Antiaircraft Artillery Brigade with attached British, Brazilian, and Italian elements. The 473d Infantry, a white unit, was assigned for some time to the black 92d Infantry Division starting from 24 February 1945 until 17 May 1945. It was used to replace the black 365th Infantry Regiment, which was reassigned to U.S. IV Corps.

In August 1945 it was deactivated in Italy.

Components
Colonel Willis D. Cronk of Headquarters Company, 2d Armored Group was placed in command during the reorganization but was soon replaced by Col. William P. Yarborough.

Units: 
Headquarters Company, 473d 
 1st Battalion / 473d Inf Regt (CO: Lt. Col. Peter L. Urban, Lt.Col. Phelan, Maj Verhuel) 
 2d Battalion / 473d Inf Regt (CO: Lt. Col Hampton H. Lisle, Maj. Crandall) 
 3d Battalion / 473d Inf Regt (CO: Maj. Paul Woodward)

References
http://www.custermen.com/ItalyWW2/Units/Division92.htm
FLAKFEET, History of the 473rd US Infantry Regiment, Vol. 1 and 2, by Marcello Biava

United States Army in World War II
473